Mannings is an unincorporated community in Jefferson County, West Virginia, United States. Mannings lies along West Virginia Route 115 on the western flanks of the Blue Ridge Mountains near the Virginia state line.

In both 2009 and 2013, a petition compiled by a developer asking for the community to be incorporated as a town was  denied by the Jefferson County Commission.

Local attractions
The Appalachian Trail runs nearby, with a trailhead at Keyes Gap.

References

Unincorporated communities in Jefferson County, West Virginia
Unincorporated communities in West Virginia